Bagmati Rural Municipality may refer to:

Bagmati Rural Municipality, Lalitpur, a rural council in Lalitpur District, Nepal
Bagmati Rural Municipality, Makwanpur, a rural council in Makwanpur District of Nepal

See also
Bagmati (disambiguation)